Sparkie may refer to:

 Sparkie Williams, a talking budgie
 Sparkie (satellite), a satellite that failed to reach orbit
 Sparkie, an elf in the radio series Big Jon and Sparkie
 Sparkie, a dragon in the television series Mike the Knight
 "Sparkie", a track on For Real!, the debut album of Ruben and the Jets
 A slang term for an electrician

See also
Sparky (disambiguation)